Senala is a village in Tuvalu, located on the Funafuti atoll, on the island of Fongafale. The settlement has an area of 0.13 km2. In 2001, it was inhabited by 574 people, and by 1207 in 2012.

References 

Populated places in Tuvalu
Funafuti